The Church of Jesus Christ of Latter-day Saints in Cambodia refers to the Church of Jesus Christ of Latter-day Saints (LDS Church) and its members in the country of Cambodia. The first branch was organized in Phnom Penh in 1994. Since then, the church has grown to more than 15,000 members in 28 congregations. In October 2018, a temple was announced to be located in Phnom Penh.

History

On March 4, 1994, the LDS Church received legal recognition by the government of Cambodia. The first branch was organized later that year in Phnom Penh.

Stakes and Districts

As of  February 2023, the following stakes and districts existed in Cambodia:

All congregations in a district are considered branches, regardless of size (wards only exist in stakes). The Cambodia Phnom Penh Mission Branch is not part of a stake or district, and serves individuals and families not in proximity to a church meetinghouse.

Missions
When the Church was introduced in 1994, Cambodia was part of the Thailand Bangkok Mission. This mission was divided in July 1998 to form the Cambodia Phnom Penh Mission. This mission initially also included Vietnam until the mission was divided again to create the Vietnam Hanoi Mission in July 2016.
The Cambodia Phnom Penh Mission mission boundaries is the same as the country's boundaries. The mission office is located in a meetinghouse at Building 2B Street 222 in Phnom Penh.

Temples
The Phnom Penh Cambodia Temple was announced on October 7, 2018 by Church President Russell M. Nelson. Groundbreaking was held September 18, 2021.

See also

Religion in Cambodia

References

External links
 The Church of Jesus Christ of Latter-day Saints (Cambodia) - Official Site
 LDS Church - Cambodia Newsroom 
 ComeUntoChrist.org Latter-day Saints Visitor site
 Not so easy being a Mormon - The Phnom Penh Post

 

Protestantism in Cambodia
Religion in Cambodia